The 62nd Annual TV Week Logie Awards ceremony was held on 19 June 2022 at The Star Gold Coast in Queensland and broadcast live on the Nine Network. It is the first ceremony to be held since 2019 due to the COVID-19 pandemic. Public voting for the Most Popular Award categories ran from 15 May through to the day of the ceremony. The ceremony was criticised for their tribute to Neighbours, which was described as an "insult to the cast and crew" online.

Winners and nominees
Nominees were announced on 15 May 2022.

Gold Logie

Acting/Presenting

Most Popular Programs

Most Outstanding Programs

Changes to the ceremony
The 2022 ceremony saw the introduction of the inaugural Bert Newton Award for Most Popular Presenter. Newton's wife Patti Newton stated: "We are so thrilled Bert is being recognised this way and will be part of the Logies every year moving forward. It was such a big part of his career and he just loved it, so I know he would be pretty pleased with this honour." The new TV Week Silver Logie for Most Popular Australian Actor or Actress in an International Program was be introduced. The award recognises the work by Australian actors in international television shows. Television personality Sophie Monk was chosen at the official TV Week Logies Event Ambassador.

Controversy
The ceremony featured a tribute to the television soap opera Neighbours, a week after it filmed its last scenes. The tribute and recognition of its achievements aired during the presentation for the Most Popular New Talent award, and was presented by former cast members, Natalie Bassingthwaighte and Daniel MacPherson. The tribute was not liked by fans online, who thought the serial should have had a larger send-off, with it being described as "embarrassing", "disappointing" and an "insult to the cast and crew for its send-off of the iconic soap" on social media. Neighbours actor Matt Wilson said on Instagram of the tribute, "37 years and this is all we get", whilst a reporter for TV Tonight revealed that the cast "were forced to watch from tables with an obstructed view." Two days later, actor Ryan Moloney (who plays Toadie Rebecchi) said, "We turned up and we did our mandatory three-hour talking to people on the red carpet. When we got in the room, we ended up being split up and stuck on two different tables. It was horrible! Our table was actually even stuck behind the cameras. We couldn't even see the stage. It was incredibly disappointing the package they put together. Daniel and Nat are just absolutely gorgeous people and absolutely nothing against them, but we've got people who have been on TV for nearly 30 years each, and I think probably the least they could do is get us to say something. I mean... we're in the bloody Hall of Fame. That's not how you treat people and a show that's in the Hall of Fame. I mean, good luck to the Logies, really."

References

External links

2022 awards in Australia
June 2022 events in Australia
2022
2022 television awards
2022 in Australian television
2020s in Queensland
Gold Coast, Queensland